Sustainability Management School (SUMAS) is a private business school focused on sustainability and a responsible management education (UN Sustainable Development Knowledge Program, Voluntary Initiative). This training center was founded in 2012 by Ivana Modena  with the mission of Inspiring Innovative Leaders.

SUMAS's main campus is based in the headquarters of the International Union for Conservation of Nature (IUCN) and World Wide Fund for Nature (WWF), just neighbors without any connection, in Gland in the French-speaking part of Switzerland. Moreover, the school has recently opened its second campus in Milan, Italy, in which students can attend all bachelor programs as well as graduate programs specializing in Sustainability Management and Sustainable Fashion Management.

Programs 

SUMAS offers private degree programs for different educational programs to all students coming of different ages, and up to IBCP and Bachelors, Masters, MBA, and Doctoral Degrees.

Undergraduate programs 

 Bachelor of Business Administration (BBA) in Sustainability Management.
 Bachelor of Business Administration (BBA) in Sustainable tourism Management.
 Bachelor of Business Administration (BBA) in Finance and Responsible Investment.
 Bachelor of Business Administration (BBA) in Sustainable Hospitality Management.
 Bachelor of Business Administration (BBA) in Sustainable Fashion Management.

Graduate programs

Master's programs 

All Master's programs are offered both on-campus and online.

 Master in Sustainability Management (MAM) 
 Master in Sustainable Fashion Management (MAM) 
 Master in Sustainable Hospitality Management (MAM) 
 Master in Sustainable Tourism Management (MAM)

MBA programs 

All MBA programs are offered both on-campus and online.

 Master of Business Administration (MBA) in Sustainability Management 
 Master of Business Administration (MBA) in Sustainable Fashion Management 
 Master of Business Administration (MBA) in Finance and Responsible Investment 
 Master of Business Administration (MBA) in Sustainable Tourism Management 
 Master of Business Administration (MBA) in Sustainable Hospitality Management

Doctorate programs 

 Doctorate of Business Administration (DBA) in Sustainability Management

Other programs 

 Certificate of Advance Studies (CAS).
International Baccalaureate Career-related Programme (IBCP) in Business & Sustainability.

Accreditation, Memberships, and Achievements

Accreditation 

Sustainability Management School does not hold the institutional accreditation (AAQ) to award reputable academic higher education degrees in Switzerland.

Programmatic private accreditation granted by the Accreditation Council for Business Schools and Programs (ACBSP) in 2016.
programmatic accreditations (ACBSP) do not guarantee recognition for qualifications, exams or programs passed, from said Institutions.

Affiliations & Memberships
 R20 Regions of Climate Action (R20) 
 Principles for Responsible Management Education (PRME) 
 The United Nations Global Compact (UNGC)  initiative, both Swiss and Russian networks.
 Chambre Vaudoise du Commerce et de l’Industrie (CVCI). 
Member of Swiss Private School Register. 3  search display

Ranking 
The school's Online MBA in Sustainability Management was named 18th among The 23 Best Online MBA Programs in Sustainability for 2017–2018. Moreover, Sustainability Management School achieved 4 out of 5 QS Quacarelli Simonds Stars in 2017.

Campuses

Switzerland
SUMAS is headquartered in the city of Gland, between Geneva and Laussane. Its Swiss campus is a city campus with different buildings, including:

 IUCN Campus, in the  International Union for Conservation of Nature Conservation Center.

 SUMAS Learning Center (SLC) across from the IUCN Campus. This is where teaching facilities are located.

Italy
SUMAS opened in February 2020 its brand new campus in Milan, Italy. Located in BASE Milano, students can attend Sustainability Management and Sustainable Fashion Management programs in this campus.

References

Business schools in Switzerland
Canton of Vaud